Robert Connor (1837-1896) was a member of the Wisconsin State Assembly.

Biography
Connor was born on November 25, 1837, in Houston, Scotland. and immigrated with his parents and sibling to Stratford, Ontario before moving onto Wisconsin with his own family in 1872. His son, William D. Connor, would become Lieutenant Governor of Wisconsin. Additionally, Connor was the great-grandfather of Melvin Laird, a member of the United States House of Representatives and United States Secretary of Defense, and great-great-grandfather-in-law of Jim Doyle, who became Governor of Wisconsin. He served as the town treasurer and was postmaster for Auburndale, Wisconsin. He served on the school board and was the board treasurer. Connor died on January 5, 1896, in Auburndale, Wisconsin from a stroke.

Assembly career
Connor was a member of the Assembly during the 1889 session. He was a Republican.

References

External links

People from Renfrewshire
People from Stratford, Ontario
People from Auburndale, Wisconsin
Scottish emigrants to the United States
School board members in Wisconsin
Republican Party members of the Wisconsin State Assembly
Wisconsin postmasters
1837 births
1896 deaths
19th-century American politicians